In mathematics, a sequence of positive integers an is called an irrationality sequence if it has the property that for every sequence xn of positive integers, the sum of the series

exists (that is, it converges) and is an irrational number. The problem of characterizing irrationality sequences was posed by Paul Erdős and Ernst G. Straus, who originally called the property of being an irrationality sequence "Property P".

Examples
The powers of two whose exponents are powers of two, form an irrationality sequence. However, although Sylvester's sequence
2, 3, 7, 43, 1807, 3263443, ...
(in which each term is one more than the product of all previous terms) also grows doubly exponentially, it does not form an irrationality sequence. For, letting  for all  gives

a series converging to a rational number.

Growth rate
For any sequence an to be an irrationality sequence, it must grow at a rate such that
.

This includes sequences that grow at a more than doubly exponential rate as well as some doubly exponential sequences that grow more quickly than the powers of powers of two.

Every irrationality sequence must grow quickly enough that

However, it is not known whether there exists such a sequence in which the greatest common divisor of each pair of terms is 1 (unlike the powers of powers of two) and for which

Related properties
Analogously to irrationality sequences, 
 has defined a transcendental sequence to be an integer sequence an such that, for every sequence xn of positive integers, the sum of the series

exists and is a transcendental number.

References

Integer sequences
Irrational numbers
Number theory